Graham Moughton (born 2 December 1948) is a retired English boxer. He competed at the 1972 Summer Olympics in the light-welterweight division, but was eliminated in the third bout.

References

1948 births
Living people
Boxers at the 1972 Summer Olympics
Olympic boxers of Great Britain
English male boxers
Light-welterweight boxers